The following is a list of characters that first appeared in the Channel 4 soap opera Hollyoaks in 1997, by order of first appearance.

Helen Cunningham

Dennis Richardson

Dennis Richardson is a fictional character on the long-running Channel 4 British television soap opera Hollyoaks. He was played by actor David McAlister between 1997 and 2003, when Dennis was killed off. He arrived as part of the Richardson family and was the father of Lewis Richardson and Mandy Richardson and the husband of their mother Helen Cunningham.

Dennis was first introduced as a teacher at Hollyoaks Comprehensive School. He was married to Helen and was Lewis and Mandy's father.

An abusive alcoholic, he beat up Helen and Lewis and molested Mandy. When he finds out that Mandy is dating Sol Patrick, he flew into a rage and raped her. Mandy briefly ran away, and then told the police what Dennis had done to her. He was arrested and eventually found guilty of rape, for which he was sentenced to seven years' imprisonment. During his imprisonment, Lewis committed suicide.

Dennis was released from prison five years later, and returned to Hollyoaks. He tried to explain himself to Mandy, but she refused to listen. Dennis then tried to mend his relationship with Helen when she took him to where Lewis's ashes had been scattered. She forgives him for what he has done. Mandy arrived with Tony Hutchinson, Helen's husband Gordon Cunningham and his son Max Cunningham to get rid of Dennis, and a fight broke out between Max and Dennis.

Dennis was last seen telling Mandy that he is dying of cancer, hoping she might forgive him. She bought him some alcohol to quicken his death, telling him she could never forgive him. He would die of liver disease. He is cremated, and Helen pours his ashes down the drain.

Gina Patrick

Jill Patrick

Jill Osborne (also Patrick), played by Lynda Rooke, made her first appearance on 30 October 1997. She begins working at The Dog in the Pond as a barmaid, and is soon joined by her children Kate, Gina and Sol Patrick. She and Jack Osborne, her boss, begin a relationship, eventually getting married. The marriage goes well, despite a feud between the Patrick children and Jack's children Ruth and Darren Osborne. Sol and Gina discover that they are not Jill's biological children. Gina goes missing and Sol and Jill go looking for her in a car he has stolen. He crashes it, almost killing Jill. He spends time in a Young Offenders Institute, and eventually forgives Jill for hiding the truth from him for so long. Jill is devastated to find out she has a brain tumour and later informs her family. She makes Jack agree to look after her children when she dies. Jill dies of her illness and Jack keeps his promise and cares for her children, helping Sol flee from the police abroad. Gina later leaves Hollyoaks to live in China and work at an orphanage to make Jill proud.

In 2017, Jack mentioned this to his late wife Frankie (Helen Pearson) about his marriage with Jill and her death, she spoke to Nancy saying it was his second time losing his wife since Jill and mentioned how he was devastated by her death.

The Daily Record commented on the character's death saying "When there's a problem with a character in Hollyoaks, they just kill them off."

Sol Patrick

Kate Patrick

Holly Cunningham

References

External links

, Hollyoaks
1997